The 100%KPP World Tour was the debut world tour by Japanese singer Kyary Pamyu Pamyu.
A documentary film based on the tour was released in theaters in Japan in July 2013.

Tour dates

Box office score data

Cancelled dates

Reception
The tour received positive reviews. The Fader wrote "This was the rare pop concert that felt like a genuine celebration, even a victory dance." MTV Hive complimented Kyary's "enigmatic allure."

References

External links
 Official Tour Site

2013 concert tours
Kyary Pamyu Pamyu